IDCA can refer to:
Industrial Design Council of Australia
Institute for Cultural Action
International Data Center Authority (IDCA)
International Design Conference at Aspen (IDCA)
International Development Cooperation Agency
Islamic Dawah Centre of Australia
International Digestive Cancer Alliance